The 2012 Walsh Cup is a hurling competition played by the teams of Leinster GAA and a team from Connacht GAA.  The competition differs from the Leinster Senior Hurling Championship as it also features further education colleges from both Leinster and Connacht and the winning team does not progress to another tournament at All-Ireland level. The four losers of the first round enter the Walsh Shield. Kilkenny won the final in Pearse Stadium defeating Galway by 2-20 to 1-14.

Walsh Cup

First round

Quarter-finals

Semi-finals

Final

Walsh Shield
The Walsh Shield consists of the 4 losing teams from the first round of the Walsh Cup.

Semi-finals

Final

References

External links
2012 Walsh Cup at GAA Info

Walsh Cup
Walsh Cup (hurling)